Bobla is a village and municipality in the Lerik Rayon of Azerbaijan.  It has a population of 490.  The municipality consists of the villages of Bobla, Əncəqov, and Zeynəko.

Geography 
Bobla is situated in the southern part of Azerbaijan and is located approximately 260 kilometers (161 miles) south of the capital city, Baku, and 24 kilometers (15 miles) south of Lerik, the administrative center of the Lerik Rayon. The village sits at an elevation of 1,451 meters (4,760 feet) in the Lesser Caucasus Mountains.

History 
The history of Bobla dates back to ancient times, with archaeological evidence suggesting that the area has been inhabited since the Bronze Age. During the Middle Ages, the village was part of the Shirvan Empire and was known for its production of silk, cotton, and other textiles.

Today 
Bobla is known for its mountainous terrain and its rich biodiversity. The village is a popular destination for hiking and nature exploration, with several hiking trails leading to nearby mountains, waterfalls, and rivers. The area is also home to several species of wildlife, including bears, deer, and wolves.

Tourism 
In recent years, the Azerbaijani government has invested in the development of tourism in the area surrounding Bobla, with a focus on eco-tourism, cultural tourism, and adventure tourism. The government has encouraged the development of new hiking trails and has worked to improve the infrastructure of the village to accommodate visitors.

References 

Populated places in Lerik District